Gianni Bugno (born 14 February 1964) is a retired Italian professional road racing cyclist.

Biography

Bugno was a versatile rider, able to do well in different types of races.  He won numerous stages in the Tour de France, and the Milan–San Remo classic in 1990.  In 1991 he won the Clásica de San Sebastián, and in 1994 he won the Tour of Flanders.

Bugno's greatest success was the double victory in the World Championship. In 1991 he beat Steven Rooks of the Netherlands and Miguel Indurain of Spain, and in 1992 finished ahead of Laurent Jalabert of France and Dmitri Konyshev of Russia.

Bugno's performance in the Grand Tours, however, was over-shadowed by Miguel Indurain. Bugno's victory in the Giro d'Italia in 1990 is considered one of the most dominant performances in that race — he led from start to finish.  While he won the Giro in 1990, he finished second to Indurain in the Tour de France in 1991 and third behind Indurain and Claudio Chiappucci in 1992. In a battle in the 1992 Tour, Indurain kept his calm despite Chiappucci's attack in the Alps; Bugno had to chase and cracked in the final parts of the stage.  Indurain was quoted as saying that Bugno was his biggest threat in the Tour.

Bugno retired following the 1998 road season and is now a helicopter rescue pilot. He piloted a camera helicopter for the Tour of Lombardy, on 20 October 2007, and for the whole of the 2008 Giro d'Italia. He ran for a seat in Lombard Regional Council in the Lombard regional election, 2010 for the centre left coalition of political parties, but he was not elected.

He has remained involved with the Giro d'Italia by being one of the TV helicopter pilots for the Italian national broadcaster, RAI.

He is the president of CPA (Association of Professional Cyclists). In November 2012, in the wake of the Lance Armstrong doping scandal, he demanded that an independent anti-doping body be established. He stated that the UCI could not be trusted to enforce the rules.

Career achievements

Major results

1986
 1st Giro dell'Appennino
 1st Giro del Friuli
 1st Giro del Piemonte
1987
 1st Giro dell'Appennino
 1st Coppa Sabatini
 1st Gran Premio Città di Camaiore
 1st Stage 3 Giro del Trentino
1988
 1st Giro di Calabria
 1st Giro dell'Appennino
 1st Coppa Agostoni
 1st Stage 18 Tour de France
 1st Stage 2 Tour de Romandie
1989
 1st Tre Valli Varesine
 1st GP di Marostica
 1st Stage 21 Giro d'Italia
1990
 1st  UCI Road World Cup
 1st  Overall Giro d'Italia
1st  Points classification
1st Stages 1 (ITT), 7 & 19 (ITT)
 1st  Overall Giro del Trentino
1st Stage 3
 1st Milan–San Remo
 1st Wincanton Classic
 Tour de France
1st Stages 11 & 18
1991
 1st  Road race, UCI Road World Championships
 1st  Road race, National Road Championships
 1st Clásica de San Sebastián
 1st Memorial Nencini
 2nd Overall Tour de France
1st Stage 17 (Alpe d'Huez)
 Giro d'Italia
1st Stages 2a, 10 (ITT) & 19
1992
 1st  Road race, UCI Road World Championships
 1st Milano–Torino
 1st Giro del Lazio
 1st Giro dell'Emilia
 1st Stage 4 (ITT) Tour de Suisse
 3rd Overall Tour de France
1993
 1st Grand Prix Gippingen
 1st Stage 2 Euskal Bizikleta
1994
 1st Tour of Flanders
 1st Stage 3 Giro d'Italia
 1st Stage 4 Euskal Bizikleta
1995
 1st  Road race, National Road Championships
 1st  Overall Tour Méditerranéen
1st Stages 6 (ITT) & 7
 1st Coppa Agostoni
1996
 1st Stage 15 Giro d'Italia
 1st Stage 20 Vuelta a España
 1st Stage 1 Giro del Trentino
 3rd Overall Tour de Suisse
1st Stage 5
 6th Giro di Lombardia
1997
 1st Stage 10 Tour de Langkawi
1998
 1st Stage 12 Vuelta a España

Grand Tour general classification results timeline

Classics results timeline

References

External links
Palmarès by world-of-cycling.com
Palmarès by memoire-du-cyclisme.net 
Palmarès by museociclismo.it 
Cyclistes Professionnels Associés 

1964 births
Living people
People from Brugg
Italian male cyclists
Italian Tour de France stage winners
Giro d'Italia winners
UCI Road World Champions (elite men)
Italian Giro d'Italia stage winners
Italian Vuelta a España stage winners
Tour de Suisse stage winners
UCI Road World Cup winners
UCI Road World Rankings winners
Sportspeople from Aargau
Sportspeople from Monza
Cyclists from the Province of Monza e Brianza